In Lake Tahoe folklore, Tahoe Tessie is a creature which resides in North America's largest alpine lake, Lake Tahoe, located in Nevada and California. It is said to live in an underwater tunnel that is beneath Cave Rock. Founder of the University of California, Davis's Tahoe Research Group Charles R. Goldman attributes claimed sightings to pareidolia and the mistaken identification of a large breed of fish introduced to Lake Tahoe during trout and mackinaw plantings.  The talk of Tessie is similar to the Loch Ness monster "Nessie".

In popular culture
Tahoe Tessie is a popular logo for many Tahoe-based companies, with a cartoon version being in many children's picture books, and a popular character featured in local newspapers. There even used to be a local museum and hotline, but both have closed. Purported sightings continue in modern times.

See also
 Igopogo, said to live in Lake Simcoe, Ontario
 Manipogo, said to live in Lake Manitoba, Manitoba
 Memphre, said to live in Lake Memphremagog, Quebec
 Seelkee, said to live in the swamps of what is now Chilliwack, in British Columbia
 Underwater panther, a mythological water-being common in North-American Indian lore
 List of reported lake monsters

References

California folklore
Nevada folklore
Water monsters